Jaunmokas Manor is a manor house in Tume Parish, Tukums Municipality in the historical region of Zemgale, in Latvia. Since 1991 the building has housed a woods and forestry museum, exhibiting the respective techniques and the history of forestry in the country.

History
Estate known as Jaunmokas was first mentioned in documents in 1544. 
The Neo-Gothic style structure with Art Nouveau elements was designed by architect Wilhelm Ludwig Nicholas Bockslaff (1858-1945), and built in 1901 as a hunting lodge for Mayor of Riga George Armitstead (1847-1912).

George Armitstead owned the manor until 1904 when it was sold to Brinken family. In 1910 it was again sold and became property of von Ungern-Sternberg family who owned manor until 1918.

During Latvian agrarian reforms in the 1920s manor was nationalized and its lands partitioned. In 1926 children sanatorium was established in the manor building. During Second world war military hospital of the Wehrmacht was located in the building.
During Latvian SSR there was several offices and flats located in the building. In 1976 building was taken over by Ministry of Forestry and Forest Industry and major restoration works started and as a result in 1989 manor building was turned to a museum.

See also
List of palaces and manor houses in Latvia

References

Manor houses in Latvia
Museums in Latvia
Forestry museums
Art Nouveau architecture in Latvia
Art Nouveau houses
Houses completed in 1901
Tukums Municipality